The Winnipeg Railway Museum is a railway museum located on tracks 1 and 2 within the Via Rail-operated Union Station in Winnipeg, Manitoba, Canada. Volunteers from the Midwestern Rail Association Inc., a non-profit organization founded in 1975, operate the museum.

The museum is affiliated with CMA, CHIN and Virtual Museum of Canada.

Overview 

The museum preserves rail history in Canada. The collection features the Countess of Dufferin (the first locomotive on the Canadian prairies), a variety of vintage railcars, cabooses, a Jordan spreader from 1911, the history and artifacts of the building of the Hudson Bay Railway to Churchill, Manitoba, technical displays, HO scale model layout, and a gift shop.

In 2015, restoration began on Winnipeg's last streetcar, Car 356, to be displayed at the Winnipeg Railway Museum.

The museum exhibit hall is, in fact, disused platforms and tracks that have parked exhibition locomotives, carts, and portable buildings with model-train sets on display. The staircase leading to the museum from the Via Rail station is the same one used to get onto the platform when that section was active. The other stairs have been sealed and locked to this day. As the museum is likely to get moved, it is not known what will happen to the terminal. 

Long-term plans may involve moving the Winnipeg Railway Museum elsewhere in Winnipeg to make way for a rapid transit hub station where several 'Rapid Transit' routes might meet. In preparation, the museum is now slated to close on December 31, 2021 for relocation.

Gallery

See also
Canadian National Railway
Canadian Pacific Railway
List of heritage railways in Canada

References

External links 
 

Downtown Winnipeg
Buildings and structures in downtown Winnipeg
History museums in Manitoba
Railway museums in Manitoba
Museums in Winnipeg